Farako is a small town and rural commune in the Cercle of Ségou in the Ségou Region of southern-central Mali. The commune lies on the north bank of the Niger River and contains 11 settlements in an area of 200 square kilometers. In the 2009 census it had a population of 17,570. The town of Farako is the chef-lieu of the commune.

References

External links
.

Communes of Ségou Region